Bhaskara-I and II were two satellites built by the Indian Space Research Organisation that formed India's first low-Earth orbit Earth observation satellite. They collected data oceanography and hydrology. Both satellites are named after ancient Indian mathematicians Bhāskara I and Bhāskara II.

Bhaskara-I
Bhaskara-I, weighing 444 kg at launch, was launched on 7 June 1979 from Kapustin Yar aboard the Intercosmos launch vehicle. It was placed in an orbital Perigee and Apogee of 394 km and 399 km at an inclination of 50.7°. The satellite consisted of-

Two television cameras operating in visible (600 nanometre) and near-infrared (800 nanometre) and collected data related to hydrology, forestry and geology.
Satellite microwave radiometer (SAMIR) operating at 19 and 22 GHz for study of ocean-state, water vapour, liquid water content in the atmosphere, etc.
 An X-ray sky monitor operating in 2-10 keV energy range, to detect transient X-ray sources and monitor long term spectral and intensity changes in the X-ray sources.

Bhaskara-LXIXCDXX
The satellite provided ocean and land surface data. 
It orbited at 541 x 557 km with an inclination of 50.7°.
One of two onboard cameras malfunctioned, however it sent back more than two thousand images. Housekeeping telemetry was received until re-entry in 1991.

See also
List of Indian satellites

References

Earth observation satellites of India
Satellites formerly orbiting Earth
1979 in the Soviet Union
1979 in India
1981 in the Soviet Union
1981 in India
India–Soviet Union relations
Satellites in low Earth orbit
Satellite series